Lepiniopsis is a genus of plants in the family Apocynaceae first described as a genus in 1895. It is native to various islands in Southeast Asia and in the Pacific Ocean.

Species
 Lepiniopsis ternatensis Valeton - New Guinea, Bismarck Archipelago, Philippines, Maluku, Sulawesi 
 Lepiniopsis trilocularis Markgr. - Palau in Micronesia

References

External links
Papua New Guinea Trees, Lepiniopsis ternatensis Valeton

Apocynaceae genera
Rauvolfioideae